Raise  may refer to:

Music 
Raise!, the name of a 1981 album by Earth, Wind, and Fire
 Raise (album), the name of a 1991 album by Swervedriver

Place names 
Raise, Cumbria, England
Raise (Lake District), the name of the 12th highest mountain in the Lake District on the north-west coast of England

Computing 
 , a PL/SQL error-handling command
 , an exception handling command in the  Python programming language

Other 
To bring up, see parenting
Raise, a term used in poker
Raise (mining), a vertical or inclined underground passageway in a mine
An increase in salary
The process of using a leavening agent in baking and brewing
A term used in magic (supernatural), meaning: to summon or conjure
Raise.com, an e-commerce gift card marketplace

See also
 RAISE (disambiguation)
 Raising (disambiguation)
 Relief